William Alexander Ott (1872–1951) was a prominent Invercargill, New Zealand sharebroker and businessman and Mayor of Invercargill from 1910 to 1912. During his mayoralty, the Invercargill tram network was opened.

Biography
Ott was born in Invercargill in 1872 the younger son of John George Ott, an Invercargill tailor, and Margaret Murray who had married in Dunedin in 1862. Ott also had an elder sister and a sister Margaret who died in 1870 aged four months. He trained as an accountant and became a fellow of the New Zealand Accountants' and Auditors' Association.

Ott's family came from the German village of Dörnach which is these days part of Pliezhausen in Tübingen. His uncle (Johan Jacob) Jacob Ott came to Dunedin in the early 1850s. Jacob was a shoemaker and came out employed by the Lutheran Mission under Johann Friedrich Heinrich Wohlers. Not a missionary himself, Jacob later owned the Whitehouse Hotel in Waikiwi. Jacob financed two of his siblings to follow him out to New Zealand; his sister Maria Barbara who appears on the shipping list as Elizabeth as well as William's father (Johan Georg) George.  The pair arrived in Dunedin from London on the Maori on 16 April 1857.

William Ott was elected onto the Invercargill Borough Council in 1900. In April 1910, he was elected unopposed to the Invercargill mayoralty. A year later, he was re-elected unopposed. Ott did not contest the 1912 mayoral election; it was won by William Benjamin Scandrett, who defeated Andrew Bain.

During his mayoralty, he opened the electric Invercargill tram network, with the Prime Minister Joseph Ward in attendance. It was the southernmost tram system in the world.  At the occasion, Ott was handed a cloak from the late paramount chief Topi Patuki. The Ott family returned the cloak to descendants of Patuki after six members of his family died in May 2006 when the fishing vessel Kotuku overturned in Foveaux Strait.

Family and death
On 17 April 1901, William Alexander Ott married Isabella Frew Campbell of Invercargill. They were to have one son and one daughter: William Frew Murray Ott (1903–1993; known as Murray) and Marjory Isabel Ott (b. 1908). Their mother died in 1922.  In 1925, he married Marjory Forsyth Dobie. They had two sons, Alexander Bruce Ott (known as Bruce), born 26 March 1927 and J. Malcolm Ott (known as Malcolm), born 3 June 1930.  His second wife died in 1945.

Ott's mother Margaret died in 1907 and his father George died in 1909. His eldest brother John George Ott born 1864 who spent most of his adult life in California died in 1954. William Ott died on 4 January 1951, aged 78 years. All are buried in the family grave in the Invercargill Eastern Cemetery.

References

External links

 100 years ago, a 2011 article in the Otago Daily Times showing Joseph Ward, Lord Islington and Mayor Ott returning from Stewart Island

1872 births
1951 deaths
Burials at Eastern Cemetery, Invercargill
Invercargill City Councillors
Deputy mayors of Invercargill
Mayors of Invercargill
New Zealand accountants
New Zealand people of German descent